Vidais is one of twelve civil parishes (freguesias) in the municipality of Caldas da Rainha, Portugal. The population in 2011 was 1,155, in an area of 21.49 km².

References

Freguesias of Caldas da Rainha